Spermarche—also known as semenarche—is the beginning of development of sperm in boys' testicles at puberty. It is the counterpart of menarche in girls. Depending on their upbringing, cultural differences, and prior sexual knowledge, boys may have different reactions to spermarche, ranging from fear to excitement. Spermarche is one of the first events in the life of a male leading to sexual maturity. It occurs at the time when the secondary sex characteristics are just beginning to develop. The age when spermarche occurs is not easy to determine. However, researchers have tried to determine the age in various populations by taking urine samples of boys and determining the presence of spermatozoa. The presence of sperm in urine is referred to as spermaturia.

Age of occurrence 
1986 Year Book of Pediatrics stated "Fish [Hirsch - n.n.] et al. (J. Adolesc. Health Care 6:35, 1985) have suggested that spermarche is present in 38% of boys at age 12 and 70% of boys at age 13." 

Caroline Sahuc gives the range 10–16 years old for spermarche.

According to Moshang, genital Tanner 3 stage implies spermarche.

Planned Parenthood says that the age of spermarche is between 10 and 12 years old, "though some start a little sooner and others a little later".

Context 
In one study, boys were asked the circumstances in which their first ejaculation occurred. Most commonly this occurred via a nocturnal emission, with a significant number experiencing semenarche via masturbation, which is very common at that stage. Less commonly, the first ejaculation occurred during sexual intercourse with a partner.

See also 
Adrenarche

References 

Developmental biology
Developmental stages
Human male reproductive system
Puberty
Sexual health
Sexuality and age
Men's health